Academy of Entrepreneurship Journal is a bi-monthly peer-reviewed academic journal of Academy of Entrepreneurship that covers the fields of management and entrepreneurship, business model evolution, Family business, start-up, Customer relationship management, Consumer behaviour and e-commerce.

Its editors-in-chief is Suhaimi Bin Mhd. Sarif (International Islamic University Malaysia). It was established in 2015 and is published by Allied Business Academies, which is affiliated with the predatory OMICS Publishing Group.

Abstracting and indexing
The journal is abstracted and indexed in Scopus, DOAJ, and ABI/Inform.

References

External links
 

English-language journals
Bimonthly journals
Business and management journals
Publications established in 1995
Public administration journals
Accounting journals
Business law journals
Marketing journals
Entrepreneurship organizations
Allied Academies academic journals